1977 (also known as Terius Nash: 1977) is the fourth album by American R&B singer, songwriter, and producer The-Dream. It was originally released as a free download on August 31, 2011, through the singer's Radio Killa website. Recorded over the course of two weeks, the album was issued in response to contractual issues with The-Dream's label, Def Jam Recordings, delaying the production of his planned IV Play album. 1977 was later released for commercial sale by Def Jam on December 18, 2012, and IV Play followed in 2013.

Recording
Following issues with his contract with Def Jam Recordings, production on The-Dream's purported fourth studio album Love IV MMXII halted, having originally been due for release of September 20, 2011. As a result, The-Dream recorded additional material for a new album titled 1977 – named after the year of his birth – which he intended as a stopgap release following the delays to Love IV MMXII; the recording was done over the course of two weeks.

Music and lyrics 
According to Interview magazine, 1977 still features the "catastrophically lush productions" of The-Dream's previous three albums but departs from their "epic love-gushing Prince suite or sparse snap-and-bop". Instead, "accounts of love lost" are conceived as more of a "somber shrink visit", while the singer's "wiggling tenor sounds more liquored-up and angry than ever", with the magazine citing the song "Used to Be" as an account of "how his life's changed — at one point, he even jokes about ending it."

Release 
1977 was released as a free download through The-Dream's Radio Killa website on August 31, 2011, despite Def Jam's objections to the decision. The release was credited under the singer's legal name, Terius Nash. After Love IV MMXII failed to see a release during 2012, it was announced on November 14, 2012, that 1977 would be released for commercial sale by Def Jam on December 18, 2012. Unlike the free version of the album, where he was credited under his birth name Terius Nash, the commercial release will see The-Dream returning to being credited under his stage name. The new version of the album features the additional tracks "AK47" and "Tender Tendencies". Love IV MMXII would later be released as IV Play in 2013.

Critical reception 

1977 was met with generally positive reviews. At Metacritic, which assigns a normalized rating out of 100 to reviews from professional critics, the album received an average score of 66, based on 10 reviews.

Reviewing in September 2011, Pitchfork critic Jordan Sargent found 1977s music "engrossing" and "vivid" as a one-sided depiction of a failing relationship. Glenn Gamboa from Newsday felt the record "doesn't quite stack up against The-Dream's more polished work, lacking his usual lyrical wordplay and musical sophistication, but the intensity of the emotion keeps it interesting." Ken Capobianco of The Boston Globe felt that The-Dream shares "too much" with the more "confessional" album and said that "his usual sensual production and delicious hooks are missing, but the rawer musical approach serves the lyrics' edges." The New York Times critic Jon Caramanica wrote, "These songs aren’t much more than melodic rants, but that’s enough for Mr. Nash, who’s never been a forceful singer, but whose talent for cramming oddball twists into R&B remains unparalleled." Robert Christgau gave 1977 a three-star honorable mention in his consumer guide for MSN Music, indicating "an enjoyable effort consumers attuned to its overriding aesthetic or individual vision may well treasure." He cited "Wedding Crasher" and "Used to Be" as highlights, although he also summed the album up with the judgement that "living for sex gets less dreamy all the time".

Other reviewers were more critical. AllMusic's Andy Kellman accused The-Dream of "tedious wallowing" and alternately "licking his wounds and puffing his chest", while Rolling Stone critic Matthew Trammell dismissed his lyrics as "poorly articulated male scorn rooted in juvenile, you-made-me-cheat reasoning". Tom Ewing from The Guardian regarded 1977 as "the worst thing" the singer had recorded, finding it marred by "unhappy, scab-picking".

Track listing

Personnel 
Credits are adapted from AllMusic.

 Sean Anderson - Composer
 Big Sean - Featured Artist
 Shawn Carter - Composer
 Casha - Featured Artist
 The-Dream - Art Direction, Design, Primary Artist
 Douglas Gibbs - Composer
 GoMillion - Photography
 Sam Holland - Assistant Engineer, Engineer
 Jaycen Joshua - Mixing
 Ralph Johnson - Composer
 Dave Kutch - Mastering
 Mike Larson - Engineer
 Ian Mercel - Assistant Engineer
 Terius Nash - Composer, Musician, Primary Artist
 Terius "The-Dream" Nash - Executive Producer, Producer

 Scott Naughton - Engineer
 Jason Patterson - Assistant
 Dave Pensado - Mixing
 Pharrell - Featured Artist
 Todd Russell - Art Direction, Design
 Bart Schoudel - Engineer
 Brian "B-Luv" Thomas - Engineer
 Pat Thrall - Engineer, Guitar, Mixing
 Robert Vaughn - Vocals
 Pharrell Williams - Composer
 Kristen Yiengst - Art Producer
 Jordan "DJ Swivel" Young - Engineer

Charts

References

External links
 

2012 albums
The-Dream albums
Albums produced by The-Dream
Def Jam Recordings albums